Verbena stricta, also known as hoary verbena or hoary vervain, is a small purple wildflower native to a large region of the central United States.

Region 
Verbena stricta is native to Oklahoma, Kansas, Nebraska, South Dakota, North Dakota, Colorado, Wyoming, Minnesota, Wisconsin, Michigan, Iowa, Indiana, Illinois, and Ohio. Because of its versatility and hardiness, the species is even more widespread; the only states where it does not appear are Oregon, California, Louisiana, Florida, South Carolina, Virginia, New Jersey, Connecticut, Rhode Island, Massachusetts, Vermont, New Hampshire, and Maine. It is mostly found in meadows; fields; dry, sandy soils; and anthropogenic biomes, which include man-made or disturbed habitats. Due to the habitats V. stricta lives in, it is an extremely drought-resistant and nonaggressive species.

Plant structure

Growth 
This spike includes a densely packed cluster of half-inch (1 cm) flowers.

Flower 
The flowers can bloom in a variety of colors, the majority of them purple or a lavender shade, with rose pink or white rarely appearing. The flower includes five petals fused at the base, forming a short tube. The petal lobes are unequal in size and length, with the two later lobes being the largest and a notched lobe at the top of the bottom lobe. As the plant ages, the spike atop the plant will elongate. The spike topping the plant will eventually seed and encapsulate tiny nutlets. The fruit is usually 0.08–0.12 inches (2–3 mm) in length when ripe.

Leaves 
The leaves have a heavy serrated edge with an oval to egg shape and a pointed tip. All leaves are covered in dense hair and are completely stalkless. The stems of this plant are square and are also covered in short, dense hair. The base of the stem can include a reddish color.

Season 
Verbena stricta blooms in the early summer and stays flowering through September until its seeds ripen.

Benefits 
Verbena stricta is an extremely important component of many butterfly gardens, as the leaves are the ideal food for the larval form of the common buckeye butterfly. The seeds are also an important dietary portion of many small birds and mammals.

References

External links 
 

Flora of Oklahoma
Flora of Kansas
Flora of Nebraska
Flora of Colorado
Flora of Wyoming
stricta
Flora without expected TNC conservation status